Euridice BA 2037 is a 1975 Greek-West German co-production black and white dramatic surrealist underground film directed by Nikos Nikolaidis, his debut feature film.

Accolades
Despite a lukewarm reaction by viewers, critics appreciated the innovative perspective on the classic Greek tragedy of Orpheus and Eurydice and noted the originality of Nikolaidis' artistic techniques. It is characteristic that Nikolaidis himself believed Euridice BA 2037 to be his best film.

André Z. Labarrére and Olivier Labarrére, authors of Atlas du cinéma, wrote that the film was one of the "New Greek Cinema" films that "radically transformed the panorama."

For this film, Nikolaidis won the Best New Director Award, the Greek National Ministry of Culture Award, as well as the Athens Film Critics Association Best Picture Award at the Thessaloniki Festival of Greek Cinema in September 1975, where Marie-Louise Bartholomew, who was involved in the production of the film, also won the Best Set Designer Award, and Andreas Andreadakis, who was involved in the editing of the film, also won the Best Editor Award.

Cast
Vera Tschechowa as Eurydice
John Moore as Man
Niki Triantafillidi as Woman
Manolis Logiadis

References

Further reading
Variety's Film Reviews, Volume 14: 1975–1977, New York, New York: R.R. Bowker, 1989.

External links
Euridice BA 2037 at Nikos Nikolaidis (Film Director/Writer/Producer)

Euridice BA 2037 at the Greek Film Archive Film Museum:  Home Page , Digital Archives , Filmography 
Euridice BA 2037 at 5 Books, 6 Films, and... Nikos Nikolaidis: Films
Euridice BA 2037 at The New York Times Movies
Euridice BA 2037 at Film Portal: Filme 

1970s avant-garde and experimental films
1975 drama films
1975 independent films
1975 films
Films based on classical mythology
Films directed by Nikos Nikolaidis
Films set in Greece
Films shot in Greece
German avant-garde and experimental films
German black-and-white films
German drama films
German independent films
Greek black-and-white films
Greek drama films
1970s Greek-language films
Orpheus
Tragedies (dramas)
West German films
1975 directorial debut films
1970s German films